Lydia Hamilton Smith (February 14, 1813 – February 14, 1884) was the long-time housekeeper of Thaddeus Stevens and a prominent black businesswoman after his death.

Early life

Lydia Hamilton was born at Russell Tavern near Gettysburg in Adams County, Pennsylvania, US. She "was the widow of a Gettysburg Negro barber [Jacob Smith-died 1852], by whom she had two children.  She was a comely quadroon with Caucasian features and a skin of light-gold tint...with Irish eyes."<ref>Sandburg, Carl. "Abraham Lincoln, The Prairie Years and The War Years. The Reader's Digest Association, Pleasantville, New York. 1970. P. 236.</ref> Her mother was a free mulatto woman of European and African descent, and her father was Irish.

Career with Stevens
Separated from her husband, Smith moved to Lancaster with her mother and sons in 1847 and accepted a position as housekeeper to prominent lawyer and abolitionist Thaddeus Stevens, who had moved from Gettysburg five years earlier but practiced law and had business interests in several counties in the Susquehanna River basin. Stevens was elected to the U.S. House of Representatives the following year, and Smith continued to keep the bachelor's house (including his house in Washington, D.C.) until Stevens died in 1868.

Smith was described as "giving great attention to her appearance," and in later years she had her clothes made to resemble those of Mary Lincoln. Carl Sandburg described Smith as "a comely quadroon with Caucasian features and a skin of light-gold tint, a Roman Catholic communicant with Irish eyes ... quiet, discreet, retiring, reputed for poise and personal dignity."

Smith had two sons, William and Isaac, by her late husband, Jacob Smith. She and Stevens also raised the latter's nephews, whom he adopted in the 1840s.  On April 2, 1861, Smith's older son, William Smith, fatally shot himself while handling a pistol at Stevens's home, as his mother watched. William Smith was 26 years old and worked as a shoemaker in Lancaster. Her other son, Isaac Smith, a banjo player and barber, enlisted in the 6th United States Colored Infantry Regiment in 1863 and served in Virginia.

No evidence exists as to the exact nature of the relationship between Stevens and Smith. In the one brief surviving letter from Stevens to her, he addresses her as "Mrs. Smith," unusual deference to an African-American servant in that era. Family members also asked Stevens to be remembered to "Mrs. Smith." Nonetheless, during her time with Stevens, neighbors considered her his common-law wife.Richard Nelson Current, Thaddeus Stevens: The Man and the Politician (University of Wisconsin-Madison, 1939), page 122 Smith not only handled social functions for the politician, she also mingled with Stevens's guests, who were instructed to address her as "Madame" or "Mrs. Smith." Opposition newspapers (for Stevens's views concerning racial equality were quite controversial) claimed she was frequently called "Mrs. Stevens" by people who knew her.

Smith was at Stevens's bedside when he died in Washington, D.C. on August 11, 1868, along with his friend Simon Stevens and surviving nephew (Thaddeus Stevens Jr.), two African-American nuns, and several other people. Under Stevens's will, Smith was allowed to choose between a lump sum of $5,000 or a $500 annual allowance; she was also allowed to take any furniture in his house. With the inheritance, Smith purchased Stevens' house and the adjoining lot.

Businesswoman

Stevens and Smith were active in the Underground Railroad, which led to the burning of his ironworks, Caledonia Furnace, during the Civil War. Recent excavation of their house in Lancaster unearthed a cistern with a passageway to a nearby tavern, as well as a spittoon inside, which some historians think was used to shelter escaping slaves.Harris, Bernard (April 7, 2011).  "Historical Ties Proven: Stevens Home Was on Underground Railroad."  LancasterOnline.com.  Retrieved October 6, 2019. Smith bought her house in Lancaster next to Stevens's house in 1860. During and after the Battle of Gettysburg in 1863, Smith hired a horse and wagon, and collected food and supplies for the wounded of both sides from neighbors in Adams, York and Lancaster counties and delivered them to the makeshift hospitals. After Stevens's death in 1868, in addition to buying his house in Lancaster, Smith operated a prosperous boarding house across from the Willard Hotel in Washington, D.C., as well as invested in real estate and other business ventures.

Death and legacy

Lydia Hamilton Smith died in Washington on her 71st birthday in 1884 and, per her wishes, was buried in St. Mary's Catholic cemetery in Lancaster, although she also left money for the continued upkeep of Stevens's grave at the Shreiner-Concord cemetery.

In Steven Spielberg's 2012 film Lincoln, Smith was portrayed by actress S. Epatha Merkerson.

Notes and references

Further reading
Carlson, Peter. "Lincoln's Feisty Foil." American History, vol. 48, no. 1 (Apr. 2013), pp. 50–55.
Delle, James A., and Mary Ann Levine.  "Archaeology, Intangible Heritage, and the Negotiation of Urban Identity in Lancaster, Pennsylvania." Historical Archaeology'', vol. 45, no. 1 (2011), pp. 51–66

1813 births
1884 deaths
Businesspeople from Lancaster, Pennsylvania
People from Adams County, Pennsylvania
American people of Irish descent
African Americans in the American Civil War
Women in the American Civil War
African-American abolitionists
Underground Railroad people
African-American women in business
19th-century American businesspeople
19th-century American businesswomen
African-American Catholics
19th-century African-American women